The La Costa WCT was a men's tennis tournament played in La Costa, California, from 1973 to 1977. The event was part of the WCT Tour and was played on outdoor hard courts.

Finals

Singles

Doubles

References
 ATP World Tour archive

World Championship Tennis
Defunct tennis tournaments in the United States
Carlsbad, California